Kapice may refer to the following places:
Kapice, Lublin Voivodeship (east Poland)
Kapice, Podlaskie Voivodeship (north-east Poland)
Kapice, West Pomeranian Voivodeship (north-west Poland)